Jay Murray Winter (born May 28, 1945) is an American historian. He is the Charles J. Stille Professor of History at Yale University, where he focuses his research on World War I and its impact on the 20th century. His other interests include remembrance of war in the 20th century, such as memorial and mourning sites, European population decline, the causes and institutions of war, British popular culture in the era of the First World War and the Armenian genocide of 1915. He is completing a biography of René Cassin.

He obtained his A.B. at Columbia and his Ph.D. at Cambridge. Winter is also affiliated with the Historial de la Grande Guerre in Peronne, France, a research center and museum of the First World War in European cultural history.

Winter is an influential scholar in the study of the First World War and its place in twentieth-century European history and culture.  His earlier work was largely that of social history, including The Great War and the British People (1986) focuses on the war's demographic impact on the British population.  In more recent works he has taken the approach of a cultural historian, most notably in Sites of Memory, Sites of Mourning (1995) where he advocates a more transnational focus for studying the war and European culture. In this book, he analyzes the various ways the people of Germany, France and Great Britain mourned their losses during and after the war.

He has also co-authored and co-edited books on the First World War, including a survey of the war's historiography, The Great War in History:  Debates and Controversies, 1914 to the Present (with Antoine Prost, 2006) and The Great War and the Twentieth Century (with Geoffrey Parker and Mary Habeck, 2000). He is co-director of the project on Capital Cities at War: Paris, London, Berlin 1914-1919, which has produced two volumes.

Jay Winter was co-producer, co-writer and chief historian for the PBS series "The Great War and the Shaping of the 20th Century," which won an Emmy Award, a Peabody Award and a Producers Guild of America Award for best television documentary in 1997.

At Yale, he teaches a lecture course entitled "Europe in the Age of Total War, 1914-1945," in which he argues that World War I, World War II, and the inter-war period, are better understood as one "European Civil War." He also teaches a seminar entitled "The First World War."

He also worked with American demographer Michael S. Teitelbaum on high levels of migration toward countries experiencing fairly low fertility rates (The Fear of Population Decline, 1986 and A Question of Numbers, 1998).

Works
Socialism and the Challenge of War: Ideas and Politics in Britain, 1912-18 (Routledge, 1974)
The Fear of Population Decline (with Michael S. Teitelbaum) (Academic Press, 1986)
The Great War and the British People (Harvard University Press, 1986)
The Experience of World War I (Macmillan, 1988)
Sites of Memory, Sites of Mourning: The Great War in European Cultural History (Cambridge University Press, 1995)
1914-1918: The Great War and the Shaping of the 20th Century (1996) 
A Question of Numbers (with Michael S. Teitelbaum) (1998) 
War and Remembrance in the Twentieth Century (Cambridge University Press, 1999, editor)
America and the Armenian Genocide of 1915 (Cambridge University Press, 2003, editor)
 editor with Antoine Prost. The Great War in history: debates and controversies, 1914 to the present (Cambridge University Press, 2005).
Remembering War: The Great War between History and Memory in the 20th Century (Yale University Press, 2006)
Dreams of Peace and Freedom: Utopian Moments in the 20th Century (Yale University Press, 2008) 
 editor. The Cambridge History of the First World War: Volume 1, Global War (Cambridge University Press, 2016)
War Beyond Words: Languages of Remembrance from the Great War to the Present (Cambridge University Press, 2017)
The Day the Great War Ended, 24 July 1923: The Civilianization of War (Oxford University Press, 2022}

References

Sources
 Oliver, Lizzie. "Jay Winter, War Beyond Words: Languages of Remembrance from the Great War to the Present." Journal of Contemporary History 55.2 (2020): 443-445.
 Winter, Jay. "Learning the Historian’s Craft" (H-Diplo 13 November 2020) online autobiography

External links
Official page at Yale
Interview on PBS.org

1945 births
Living people
Yale University faculty
Columbia College (New York) alumni
Academic staff of the European University Institute
American military historians
American male non-fiction writers
Alumni of the University of Cambridge
Members of the Norwegian Academy of Science and Letters
Historians of World War I